= List of ambassadors of Turkey to Algeria =

The list of ambassadors of Turkey to Algeria provides a chronological record of individuals who have served as the diplomatic representatives of the Republic of Turkey to the People's Democratic Republic of Algeria.

== List of ambassadors ==
Ambassador	Term start	Term end	Ref.
Semih Günver	30 June 1963	31 August 1965	
İsmail Soysal	30 September 1965	16 August 1969	
Efdal Deringil	19 August 1969	13 December 1971	
Faik Melek	31 December 1971	16 July 1978	
Selçuk Korkud	2 September 1978	18 March 1982	
Sencer Asena	28 May 1982	2 November 1984	
Savlet K. Aktuğ	2 November 1984	21 February 1985	
Verşan Şentürkler	11 March 1985	6 December 1985	
Erdil K. Akay	8 January 1986	6 September 1989	
Ömer Ersun	27 September 1989	18 November 1991	
Ümit Pamir	27 November 1991	17 August 1995	
Burhanettin Muz	1 September 1995	20 August 1999	
Atilla Uzer	23 August 1999	28 January 2004	
Ercümend Ahmet Enç	31 January 2004	29 March 2008	
Ahmet Necati Bigalı	1 April 2008	15 June 2012	
Adnan Keçeci	31 January 2013	1 September 2015	
Mehmet Poroy	1 September 2015	17 December 2019	
Mahinur Özdemir Göktaş	1 January 2020	Present	
